The Grumman F11F-1F Super Tiger (company designation G-98J) is a single-seat fighter aircraft originally developed for the United States Navy (USN). Based on the USN's F-11 Tiger, the F11F-1F did not proceed beyond the two F11F-1F prototypes.

Design and development
As an improvement to the F11F-1 (F-11A) fighter, Grumman proposed a more advanced version of the airframe known as the F11F-1F Super Tiger. This was the result of a 1955 study to fit the new General Electric J79 engine into the F11F airframe. The Navy was sufficiently interested to authorize modification of two production F11F-1s with enlarged air intakes and YJ79-GE-3 turbojets, with the result being designated the F11F-1F, indicating a production F11F-1 with a special engine fit.

The aircraft first flew on 25 May 1956, reaching Mach 1.44 in one of the flights. After the addition of 60° wing root fillets, a 13.5 in (35 cm) fuselage extension, and an uprated J79 engine, the F11F-1F reached an impressive Mach 2.04 in 1957, thus becoming the first naval aircraft in the world to exceed Mach 2 (two years before the F4H, F8U-3, and A3J). This was a surprise even to Grumman, which had expected a top speed of only Mach 1.4 at altitude. By comparison, the F11F-1 with the Wright J65 had had difficulty exceeding Mach 1.1. However, the U.S. Navy did not order the Super Tiger into production.

Operational history

Marketing efforts

Grumman marketed the F11F to many potential foreign customers, during the late 1950s and early 1960s. For varying reasons, this campaign was unsuccessful, including the fact that the Super Tiger had not been accepted  by the US government for any of the US services.

In a tender to equip the Swiss Air Force, the Super Tiger competed with the Saab Draken, Lockheed F-104 Starfighter, Dassault Mirage III, and Fiat G.91. The Mirage was chosen, partly on the grounds that it was cheaper and more secure in terms of replacements and spare parts; however, Swiss assessors reportedly considered that, in terms of overall technical performance, the F11F surpassed the other aircraft considered.

The German Air Force, Japan Air Self Defense Force, and Royal Canadian Air Force also showed interest. With an eye to the possibility of an order from West Germany in particular, Grumman offered to build a variant with the proven and more powerful  Rolls-Royce Avon, instead of the J79. However, following selection processes allegedly marred by the Lockheed bribery scandals, all of these potential customers chose the Lockheed F-104 Starfighter.

Variants
F11F-1F Super Tiger (G-98J) Two Grumman F11F-1 aircraft fitted with J79-GE-3A engines, (BuNos 138646 and 138647).
F11F-2 Intended pre-1962 designation of production Super Tigers.
F-11BThe post-1962 designation reserved for production Super Tigers.
XF12F Semi-official designation for a developed version of the F11F-1F/-2.

Operators

United States Navy
General Electric

Aircraft on display
The first F11F-1F (BuNo 138646) was used for fire-fighting practice and destroyed in the 1980s. The second prototype (BuNo 138647) was retired on 10 January 1961 and used as a ground training aircraft. As of October 2020, it is displayed outdoor at the China Lake Museum in Ridgecrest, CA. The aircraft is on loan from the Naval Air Weapons Station China Lake, California.

Specifications (F11F-1F)

See also

References

Notes

Bibliography
Angelucci, Enzo and Peter M. Bowers. The American Fighter. Sparkford, UK: Haynes Publishing, 1987. .
Bowers, Peter M. United States Navy Aircraft since 1911. Annapolis, Maryland: Naval Institute Press, 1990, pp. 183–185. .
Buttler, Tony. American Secret Projects: Fighters & Interceptors 1945-1978. Hinckley, Leicestershire, UK: Midland Publishing, 2008, First edition 2007. .

External links

F11F Super Tiger
Grumman F11F
Single-engined jet aircraft
Carrier-based aircraft
Cancelled military aircraft projects of the United States
Mid-wing aircraft
Aircraft first flown in 1956